Jang Mi In-Ae (born May 28, 1984) is a South Korean former actress. She starred in the sitcoms Nonstop and Soulmate, as well as the television dramas Dear My Sister and Missing You.
 
In 2013, she was investigated then indicted for illegal use of the narcotic propofol. The Seoul Central District Court found Jang guilty of taking propofol 410 times over six years (or 5.6 times a month), and she was sentenced to eight months in prison, suspended for two years.

Personal life
On August 18, 2022, Jang announced that she was pregnant and about to give birth in October. Her marriage is expected to be around next year after her birth.

Filmography

Television series

Film

Variety show

Music video

References

External links
 Jang Mi-inae at Cyworld
 Jang Mi-inae at C-JeS Entertainment
 
 

South Korean television actresses
South Korean film actresses
1984 births
Living people
South Korean people convicted of drug offenses